The 28th Street station was a station on the demolished IRT Sixth Avenue Line in Manhattan, New York City. It had two tracks and two side platforms. It was served by trains from the IRT Sixth Avenue Line. This station opened in 1892. From 1910 to 1937 it also had a connection to the 28th Street (H&M station). It closed on December 4, 1938. The next southbound stop was 23rd Street. The next northbound stop was 33rd Street.

References

IRT Sixth Avenue Line stations
Railway stations closed in 1938
Former elevated and subway stations in Manhattan
1938 disestablishments in New York (state)

Sixth Avenue
Railway stations in the United States opened in 1892
1892 establishments in New York (state)